Aisha Ismail, MON, appointed Minister of Women Affairs from June 1999 until May 2003, is a Nigerian matriarch and public servant.

Biography 
Aishatu Ismail was educated at Ahmadu Bello University and University College of Swansea in Wales, United Kingdom.

She served in the Government of Kano State during the 1980s, becoming the first female commissioner in the Kano State Executive Council.

She became the first director general of the National Commission for Women in 1992.

At various times between 1992 and 1994, she was a Special Envoy to the Organisation of African Unity (now African Union), Head of Delegation to the United Nations Commission on the Status of Women in Vienna and President of the African Regional Coordinating Committee on the Integration of Women in Development of the United Nations Economic Commission for Africa.

Aisha served in the Cabinet of Olusegun Obasanjo as the Federal Minister of Women Affairs and Youth Development from 1999 until 2003. She worked on the passage of 2003 Child Rights Act, and during her tenure was a member of the opposition All Nigeria People's Party.

She was made a Member of the Order of the Niger awarded "for services to the nation"; she attended the 2014 National Conference as a delegate from Kano State.

After leaving public service, she dedicated herself to her private life.

References

Living people
People from Kano State
Nigerian diplomats
Federal ministers of Nigeria
All Nigeria Peoples Party politicians
Women government ministers of Nigeria
Year of birth missing (living people)